Claire Mafféi (1919–2004) was a French stage and film actress. She is best known for her role in the 1947 comedy-drama Antoine and Antoinette by Jacques Becker. She was married to the screenwriter Claude Vermorel.

Selected filmography
 Women's Games (1946)
 Antoine and Antoinette (1947)
 The Most Beautiful Life (1956)

References

Bibliography
 Danielle E. Hipkins & Gill Plain. War-torn Tales: Literature, Film and Gender in the Aftermath of World War II. Peter Lang, 2007.

External links

1919 births
2004 deaths
French film actresses
French stage actresses
Actresses from Lyon
20th-century French actresses